is a 2002 Japanese telefilm starring members of the all-girl J-pop group Morning Musume.

Shinshun! Love stories is an anthology film based on three different romantic stories: The Dancing Girl of Izu, Haikara-san ga Tōru and Toki o Kakeru Shōjo. The film aired on Tokyo Broadcasting System on January 2, 2002. A limited edition DVD was released on October 26, 2005.

Segments

The Dancing Girl of Izu 
The Dancing Girl of Izu stars Maki Goto along with Kei Yasuda and Nozomi Tsuji.

Haikara-san ga Toru
Haikara-san ga Tōru stars Rika Ishikawa along with Hitomi Yoshizawa, Mari Yaguchi, Ai Takahashi, Risa Niigaki, Makoto Ogawa and Asami Konno.

Toki o Kakeru Shojo
Toki o Kakeru Shōjo stars Natsumi Abe as Kazuko Yoshiyama, Kaori Iida as her friend, Ai Kago as her sister, and actors Takashi Nagayama and Asahi Uchida.

External links
  

2002 television films
2002 films
Japanese anthology films
2002 drama films
Japanese drama films
Japanese television films
Hello! Project
The Girl Who Leapt Through Time
2000s Japanese films